The 2018–19 season was Guadalajara's third competitive season and third season in the Liga MX Femenil, the top flight of Mexican women's football.

The season started under a new manager, Ramón Villa Zevallos, who won the Clausura 2019 tournament with Tigres UANL.

Guadalajara finished fifth on the Apertura tournament, qualifying for the playoffs; but were eliminated right away on quarterfinals by rivals América.

Guadalajara started the new tournament with a positive balance. Nevertheless, on 22 May 2020, the Clausura tournament was canceled due to the COVID-19 pandemic; in that moment Guadalajara was ranked third.

Squad

Apertura

Clausura

Transfers

In

Out

Coaching staff

Competitions

Overview

Torneo Apertura

League table

Matches

Playoffs

Quarterfinals

Torneo Clausura

League table

Matches

Statistics

Appearances and goals

|-

|-
! colspan=10 style=background:#dcdcdc | Players that left the club during the season

|}

Goalscorers

References

C.D. Guadalajara (women) seasons
Mexican football clubs 2019–20 season